Almamy Kabele Camara (born 29 May 1952), is a Guinean football official. Since February 2011, he has been a member of the CAF Executive Committee and since 2012 the 2nd Vice President of this committee.

Furthermore, he was elected as a member of the FIFA Council on 29 September 2016.

References 

Living people
Football in Guinea
FIFA officials
1952 births